is a passenger railway station located in the city of Yokkaichi, Mie Prefecture, Japan, operated by the private railway operator Sangi Railway.

Lines
Akatsuki Gakuenmae Station is served by the Sangi Line, and is located 5.3 kilometres from the terminus of the line at Kintetsu-Tomida Station.

Layout
The station consists of a single side platform serving bi-directional traffic

Platforms

Adjacent stations

History
It was renamed to its present name on August 21, 1965, when the station building was rebuilt.

Passenger statistics
In fiscal 2019, the station was used by an average of 1548 passengers daily (boarding passengers only).

Surrounding area
Akatsuki Junior High School / High School (Kayou Castle Ruins) 
Mie Prefectural Kuwana Nishi High School

See also
List of railway stations in Japan

References

External links

Sangi Railway official home page

Railway stations in Japan opened in 1931
Railway stations in Mie Prefecture
Yokkaichi